Kobylnice is name of several locations:
 Czech Republic
Kobylnice (Kutná Hora District)
Kobylnice (Mladá Boleslav District)
Kobylnice (Brno-Country  District)
 Slovakia
Kobylnice (Svidník District)